SS Connecticut was a 8684 ton tanker ship built in 1938 by Bethlehem Shipbuilding Corporation and used for a World War II. She operated her under the United States Merchant Marine act for the War Shipping Administration, with United States Navy Armed Guards to man her deck guns. To stop from sinking the Connecticut ran aground and was later salvaged. The attack took place 10 nautical miles off the mouth of the Columbia River near Oregon. The Japanese attack on the Connecticut was under the command of Lieutenant Commander Akiji Tagami.

The Connecticut was later sunk on April 22, 1942 in the middle of the South Atlantic, while in route from Port Arthur, Texas, to Cape Town, South Africa. German torpedo boat Esau (LS-4) from auxiliary cruiser SS Michel torpedoed the  Connecticut at 2:10am. The first torpedo started a fire to her cargo of 84,299 barrels of gasoline and heating oil. The radio operator was able send out a SOS call before the second torpedo hit and blew the ship apart. The attack killed 35 men and one more died aboard the merchant raider  Michel. All 11 of the Navy Armed Guards were killed. Only 18 survived, they were turned over to Japan at Yokohama. Two of the Prisoner of wars died under the barbaric conditions as POWs of the Japanese. Connecticut rest at 22.58 S - 16.05 W. After the war 16 of her POW made it back home.

The merchant raider Michel was torpedoed and sunk by the US submarine USS Tarpon on October 17, 1943, near Tokyo Bay all 263 men went down with the ship.

See also
California during World War II
American Theater (1939–1945)
United States home front during World War II
Home front during World War II

External links
Hilfskreuzer Michel on Bismarck & Tirpitz, with list of all captured ships.

References

 

1938 ships
World War II tankers of the United States
Maritime incidents in December 1941
Maritime incidents in April 1942
World War II shipwrecks in the South Atlantic